Megaloceroea is a genus of plant bugs in the family Miridae. There are at least three described species in Megaloceroea.

Species
These three species belong to the genus Megaloceroea:
 Megaloceroea punctata Knight
 Megaloceroea recticornis (Geoffroy in Fourcroy, 1785)
 Megaloceroea rubicunda Schmidt

References

Further reading

External links

 

Miridae genera
Articles created by Qbugbot
Stenodemini